Duclos-Guyot Bluff (‘Vrah Duclos-Guyot’ \'vrah dyu-'klo gi-'yo\) is the ice-covered peak rising to 1800 m at the south extremity of Urda Ridge on Clarence Island in the South Shetland Islands, Antarctica.  It has precipitous and partly ice-free south slopes, and surmounts Skaplizo Glacier to the west and Dobrodan Glacier to the northeast.

The peak is named after the French mariner Nicolas Pierre Duclos-Guyot (1722-1794), second in command under Louis Antoine de Bougainville in the first French circumnavigation of the world, who sailed in Antarctic waters on board the Spanish ship León in 1756.

Location
British mapping in 1972 and 2009.

Maps
British Antarctic Territory. Scale 1:200000 topographic map. DOS 610 Series, Sheet W 61 54. Directorate of Overseas Surveys, Tolworth, UK, 1972.
South Shetland Islands: Elephant, Clarence and Gibbs Islands. Scale 1:220000 topographic map. UK Antarctic Place-names Committee, 2009.
 Antarctic Digital Database (ADD). Scale 1:250000 topographic map of Antarctica. Scientific Committee on Antarctic Research (SCAR). Since 1993, regularly upgraded and updated.

References
 Bulgarian Antarctic Gazetteer. Antarctic Place-names Commission. (details in Bulgarian, basic data in English)
 Duclos-Guyot Bluff. SCAR Composite Gazetteer of Antarctica.

External links
 Duclos-Guyot Bluff. Copernix satellite image

Mountains of the South Shetland Islands
Bulgaria and the Antarctic